USS Beloit (LCS-29) is a  littoral combat ship of the United States Navy. She will be the first commissioned ship in naval service named after Beloit, Wisconsin. This honors the contributions Beloit has made to the US Navy, especially the engines built in its Fairbanks Morse plant, including USS Beloits own powerplant.

Design 
In 2002, the US Navy initiated a program to develop the first of a fleet of littoral combat ships. The Navy initially ordered two monohull ships from Lockheed Martin, which became known as the Freedom-class littoral combat ships after the first ship of the class, . Odd-numbered U.S. Navy littoral combat ships are built using the Freedom-class monohull design, while even-numbered ships are based on a competing design, the trimaran hull  from General Dynamics. The initial order of littoral combat ships involved a total of four ships, including two of the Freedom-class design. Beloit will be the fifteenth Freedom-class littoral combat ship to be built.

Construction and career 
Marinette Marine was awarded the contract to build Beloit on 18 September 2018. She was christened and launched on 7 May 2022 at the shipyard in Marinette, Wisconsin. The ship's sponsor is Beloit-born Major General Marcia Anderson, (USAR, Ret.). Now retired, she was the first African-American woman to reach the rank of Major General in the US Army, US Army Reserve and the US Army National Guard.

References

 
 

 
Freedom-class littoral combat ships
Lockheed Martin
2022 ships